Ebenezer Mattoon (August 19, 1755 – September 11, 1843) was a United States representative from Massachusetts. He was born in North Amherst in the Province of Massachusetts Bay on August 19, 1755. He attended the common schools and received private instruction.  He graduated from Dartmouth College in 1776.  Mattoon served in the Revolutionary Army.  He taught school and also engaged in agricultural pursuits.

He was a member of the Massachusetts House of Representatives, was a justice of the peace 1782-1796, and served in the Massachusetts State Senate.  He served from the rank of captain to that of major general of the Fourth Division, State militia.  He was appointed Sheriff of Hampshire County and served twenty years.  Mattoon was elected as a Federalist to the Sixth Congress to fill the vacancy caused by the resignation of Samuel Lyman.  He was reelected to the Seventh Congress and served from February 2, 1801 – March 3, 1803.

He again served as a state representative in 1812.  He also served as adjutant general of the Massachusetts Militia with the rank of major general from 1816 to 1818.  He was elected captain of the Ancient and Honorable Artillery Company of Massachusetts in 1817 and served a one-year term.  He became totally blind in 1818 and retired from active public life.

He was a delegate to the state constitutional convention in 1820.  Mattoon died in Amherst on September 11, 1843.  His interment was in West Cemetery.

External links

Members of the Massachusetts House of Representatives
Massachusetts state senators
Massachusetts sheriffs
Dartmouth College alumni
1755 births
1843 deaths
American blind people
Federalist Party members of the United States House of Representatives from Massachusetts
Adjutants General of Massachusetts